Thor Lund (27 May 1921 in Aker – 16 June 1999) was a Norwegian politician for the Labour Party.

He was elected to the Norwegian Parliament from Aust-Agder in 1969, and was re-elected on two occasions. He had previously served as a deputy representative during the term 1965–1969.

On the local level he was a member of Stokken municipal council from 1955 to 1961, serving as deputy mayor from 1959. Stokken was incorporated into Moland municipality, but Lund remained as a municipal council member from 1962 to 1975. He later returned to serve as mayor from 1983 to 1989. From 1962 to 1963 he was also a member of Aust-Agder county council. He chaired the local party chapter from 1954 to 1971 and 1982 to 1988.

Outside politics he worked as a firefighter in Oslo and a mechanic in Eydehavn. He was a member of various official boards and councils, serving on the board of Aust-Agder Sparebank from 1983 to 1984.

References

1921 births
1999 deaths
Members of the Storting
Mayors of places in Aust-Agder
Labour Party (Norway) politicians
20th-century Norwegian politicians